The Neyveli Zero Lignite Power Station is an lignite based power station at Neyveli in Cuddalore district, Tamil Nadu, India. The power station is owned by ST CMS Electric Company India Limited, which is a subsidiary of TAQA (also known as Abu Dhabi National Energy Company) which acquired it from Sharad Tak Power Systems in 2007.

Capacity
The installed capacity of the power plant in 250 MW (1x250 MW). There were allegation of corruption in granting of power plant to Sharad Tak Power Systems.

References

Coal-fired power stations in Tamil Nadu
Cuddalore district
Energy infrastructure completed in 2002
2002 establishments in Tamil Nadu